The  is an incomplete two-lane national expressway in that crosses the island of Kyushu, namely in Kumamoto Prefecture and Miyazaki Prefecture. It is owned and operated primarily by the Ministry of Land, Infrastructure, Transport and Tourism (MLIT), but has a short section maintained and tolled by the West Nippon Expressway Company at its western terminus at the Kyushu Expressway. The route is signed E77 under MLIT's  "2016 Proposal for Realization of Expressway Numbering."

Interchanges 

 IC - interchange, JCT - junction, SA - service area, PA - parking area, BS - bus stop, TN - tunnel, BR - bridge, TB - toll gate
 Bus stops labeled "○" are currently in use; those marked "◆" are closed.

References

External links

Expressways in Japan
Kyushu region
Roads in Kumamoto Prefecture
Roads in Miyazaki Prefecture